The 1987 Mercantile Credit Classic was the eighth edition of the professional snooker tournament which took place from 2–11 January 1987. The tournament was played at the Norbreck Castle Hotel, Blackpool, Lancashire. Television coverage was by ITV with weekday afternoon coverage on Channel 4.

Qualifying took place in November 1986. The leading players started at the last-64 stage and had to win two matches to reach the last-16 televised stage in January. Only five of the leading 16 seeded players reached the last-16 including defending champion Jimmy White and Steve Davis

In the first semi-final Jimmy White beat Dean Reynolds in the deciding frame after fluking a red and then making a break of 74. Steve Davis beat Stephen Hendry 9–3 in the second semi-final.

Defending champion Jimmy White made it to the final again but lost to Steve Davis in another 13–12 result. Davis won the first prize of £50,000 while White took the runners-up prize of £30,000 and another £5,000 for the high break prize for his break of 126 in the semi-finals.

Main draw

Final

Qualifying

Last-64 round

Last-32 round

Century breaks
(Including qualifying rounds)

140, 112  Cliff Thorburn
136, 122, 111  Stephen Hendry
131  John Parrott
126  Jimmy White
122, 102  Mark Bennett
119, 108  Steve Davis
112  Danny Fowler
109  Tommy Murphy
106  Peter Francisco
104  Steve Duggan
104  Neal Foulds
103  Terry Griffiths
100  Jon Wright

References

Classic (snooker)
Classic
Classic
Classic
Sport in Blackpool